Alicante Club de Fútbol was a Spanish football team based in Alicante, in the Valencian Community. Founded in 1918, it played its home matches at Estadio Alicante CF, with a 4,000-seat capacity.

History
Alicante Club de Fútbol, under their previous name, were formed in 1918. Five years later, in 1923, the club joined the Valencian Football Federation, with Joaquín Tomás Terol being its first official president.

The team spent the vast majority of its early existence in the Tercera División, whilst also having very brief spells in the second division (1939–40 – as Alicante Football Club – 1951–52 and 1956–58). For eight years in the 60's, the club acted as the feeder team for neighbours Hércules CF.

In the 2000s, the club firmly established itself as one of the third level's strongest sides. However, the team still failed to get promoted, frequently missing promotion via the playoffs, until 2007–08, in which Alicante were finally promoted to the Segunda División. In the same season, the team famously took La Liga powerhouse Real Madrid to task in the fourth round of the Copa del Rey, only losing in 2–3 on aggregate against the team two divisions above.

Facing severe economic problems during the 2008–09 season, Alicante were immediately relegated back to the third division, despite a strong start to the season. The financial situation persisted in the following years and, on 1 July 2011, at the end of 2010–11, the team was relegated to the fourth division after failing to pay its players on time.

In June 2014, Alicante CF was dissolved and replaced by CFI Alicante, who adopted its colors and its logo.

Season to season

As Alicante Club de Fútbol

 5 seasons in Segunda División
 9 seasons in Segunda División B
 45 seasons in Tercera División

Stadium
Alicante held home games at Estadio Alicante CF, inside the Ciudad Deportiva de Villafranqueza, with a 4,000-seat capacity. Previously owned by the club, it was then purchased by the City Hall, and the team held their official matches there since 1979.

However, between 2001 and 2010, Alicante played at the Estadio José Rico Pérez, the home ground of Hércules CF. After returning to the third division, Villafranqueza did not possess the required structures to host games in the category, and the municipal authorities refused to renew them.

Notable former players

See also
Alicante CF B, Alicante CF's reserve team

References

External links

Official website 
Futbolme team profile 
FFCV team profile 

Alicante CF
Association football clubs established in 1918
1918 establishments in Spain
Defunct football clubs in the Valencian Community
Association football clubs disestablished in 2015
Segunda División clubs